RERA may refer to:

 Dubai Real Estate Regulatory Agency
 Ajman Real Estate Regulatory Agency
 Real Estate (Regulation and Development) Act, 2016, the regulatory law passed by the Parliament of India
 Respiratory-effort related arousal, see Respiratory disturbance index
 Rera, a fictional character, the alter ego of Nakoruru
 A discontinued photographic film

See also
 RER A